Adriana Kaegi (born March 17, 1957) is a Swiss-born American actress, producer and former singer.

Career
Kaegi co-founded the band Kid Creole and the Coconuts together with August Darnell and Coati Mundi, both formerly of Dr. Buzzard's Original Savannah Band.

The band won the British Music Award for Best International Live Act, and Kaegi appeared with the band on The Tonight Show, Saturday Night Live, the movie Against All Odds, the presidential inauguration of George H. W. Bush,  a benefit hosted by Princess Diana for the children's charity Barnardo's, the 40th anniversary of the UN, and a performance at Carnegie Hall with Cab Calloway. She has also sung with U2, Miguel Bosé, Towa Tei, Vodka Collins and created the all-female band Boomerang.

Kaegi made a documentary film about her time with Kid Creole and the Coconuts, and in 2009 released her first solo CD Tag.

Kaegi's media company was an early adopter of video content for the web. She conceived, produced and hosted one of the first interactive live webcast series from New York's Knitting Factory called "Cyber Cabaret", which received "Best live web cast" awards from Yahoo! and CNET in 1998, then went on to produce and promote live and on-demand webcasts for the fashion brands and magazines Style and Elle covering runway shows from New York, Paris and Milan.

Discography
Me No Pop I (12") 	  	Antilles 	1980
Off the Coast of Me (LP, album) 	  	ZE Records, Island Records 	1980
Fresh Fruit in Foreign Places (LP, album) 	Schweinerei 	ZE Records, Island Records 	1981
Don't Take My Coconuts (Album) (3 versions) 	  	EMI America 	1983
Doppelganger (album) (2 versions) 	  	Island Records … 	1983
War (Album) (44 versions) 	Red Light, Surrender` 	Island Records … 	1983
Boomerang (2 versions) 	  	Atlantic 	1986
These Boots Are Made For Walkin (12") 	Night Train Vocal / L… 	Atlantic 	1986
When The Phone Stops Ringing (12", Maxi) 	  	Atlantic, WEA 	1986
New York At Dawn (CD, Album) 	Other Guys 	EMI USA, Toshiba EMI Ltd 	1990
Private Waters In The Great Divide (CD, album) 	  	CBS 	1990
Sound Museum (album) (3 versions) 	Tamilano 	EastWest Japan … 	1997 
Tag (solo album) BEST of the month on Amazon 2009 
Going Out (single) 2010 Kaegi/Rogers 2011 BMI 
He Delivers (single) 2011 Kaegi/Rogers 2011 BMI 
Lock and Load (single) 2012 Kaegi/Rogers 2012 BMI 
Occupy my Heart (part of a compilation) 2012 Kaegi/Mercenck BMI/Gemma

Filmography
 Against All Odds (1984)
 Patricia Field (2013)
 Social X Rays (2014), premiered at ASOFF Fashion Film Festival at Centre Pompidou in Paris

References

External links
Addy.media website
"Adriana Kaegi: 'The Queen of Stream'", Time Out, Adrienne Weinfeld-Berg
Adriana Kaegi performs at the Poolside Lawn party

1957 births
Swiss emigrants to the United States
Living people
20th-century Swiss actresses
21st-century American women singers
21st-century American singers
21st-century Swiss actresses
Kid Creole and the Coconuts members
20th-century American women singers
20th-century American singers